Brigadier Edward Adam Butler CBE, DSO (born 27 February 1962) is a former British Army officer who commanded Task Force Helmand.

Early life
Butler is the son of Sir Adam Butler MP and a grandson of the Conservative politician "Rab" Butler.

He was educated at Eton College and the University of Exeter.

Military career
In August 1984, Butler was commissioned into the Royal Green Jackets. He was mentioned in dispatches while on active service in Northern Ireland in November 1991 and twice received the Queen's Commendation for Valuable Service; first for his service in the Former Republic of Yugoslavia in Autumn 1997 and again for his service in Sierra Leone in summer 2000.

He was awarded the Distinguished Service Order for his actions in Afghanistan as the commanding officer of 22 Special Air Service during 2001 and 2002. He became commander of 16 Air Assault Brigade in 2004, in which role he was deployed as commander of Task Force Helmand in April 2006. He went on to be Chief, Joint Force Operations at Permanent Joint Headquarters in December 2006 before retiring in December 2008, citing family reasons.

After leaving the British Army he became Chief Executive of Corporates for Crisis, a business providing advice for companies operating in difficult places, and then chairman of and latterly adviser to S-RM, an intelligence and risk consulting business. In July 2019 he was interviewed for a BBC Radio Four 'Analysis' programme; it stated he was Head of Risk Analysis (Chief Resilience Officer) at Pool Re.

Personal life
Butler is married with two children.

References

1962 births
Military personnel of the Bosnian War
British Army brigadiers
British military personnel of the Sierra Leone Civil War
British military personnel of The Troubles (Northern Ireland)
Living people
Alumni of the University of Exeter
British Army personnel of the War in Afghanistan (2001–2021)
Commanders of the Order of the British Empire
Companions of the Distinguished Service Order
Recipients of the Commendation for Valuable Service
People educated at Eton College
Royal Green Jackets officers